The Kerry District League (known as the Denny Kerry District League for sponsorship reasons) is an association football league featuring amateur and junior clubs from County Kerry. The KDL is a winter league run by Adrian Casey. Its top division, the Premier A, is a seventh level division in the Republic of Ireland football league system. The league is regularly featured in the local newspapers – The Kerryman and the Kerry's Eye.

History 
The league was formed in 1971 with eight teams competing in its first season. Its founding members included Tralee Dynamos and Killarney Athletic, both of whom had previously played in the Limerick Desmond League. Other founding members included St Brendan's Park. Tralee Dynamos were the inaugural champions and subsequently became the league's most successful team.

Mounthawk Park
The KDL purchased Mounthawk Park in Tralee in the mid–1990s. It now serves as both the headquarters of the league and as home ground for the Kerry League representative teams. Several KDL clubs, especially those in the greater Tralee area, also use Mounthawk Park as their home pitch.  
In August 2015 a new all-weather pitch was opened at Mounthawk Park by Martin O'Neill and John Delaney. It will be the home ground of newly formed Kerry F.C. in the 2023 League of Ireland First Division.

Representative teams
A senior Kerry League representative team regularly competes in the Oscar Traynor Trophy, playing against teams representing other leagues. In recent seasons they have also competed in the League of Ireland Cup. In 2016 a Kerry League U17 team will play in the League of Ireland U17 Division. Kerry now have both U17 & U19 teams competing in both the SSE Airtricity National U17 & U19 respectively.

Clubs

Premier A

List of winners by season

References

7
Association football leagues in Munster
1
1971 establishments in Ireland
Sports leagues established in 1971